Sost or SOST may refer to:

Places 
Sost, Afghanistan, a village in Badakhshan Province
Sost, Pakistan, the last town inside Pakistan on the Karakoram Highway before the Chinese border
Sost, Hautes-Pyrénées, a commune in France

Other uses 
 SOST, a gene that encodes the protein sclerostin
 Söst, Germany
 Special Operations Science and Technology ammunition, see 
 SOST, the ticker symbol for RMS Titanic Inc from 1987 to 2004

See also 
 Soest (disambiguation)